The Ruf RGT is a sports car made by Ruf Automobile of Germany.



First generation (2000–2004) 

The first-generation Ruf RGT was introduced in 2000 using an engine and chassis based on the Porsche 996.

Second generation (2005–2011) 

The car is fitted with 19 inch Ruf-designed Superleggera wheels and Michelin Pilot Sport Cup tires. Finally, the RGT is customized with interior trim of the customer's choice, including Recaro seats and the deletion of unnecessary parts to save weight.

RGT-8 
In 2010, an updated version of the 997 RGT, was unveiled at the Geneva Motor Show. The car was powered by a completely new, Ruf-designed 4.5-litre V8 engine with a 180° flat-plane crankshaft. It features four valves arranged spherically together with multipoint fuel injection which ensure optimal mixture conditions while the dry sump oil system supplies the necessary lubrication. Ruf made the RGT-8 as light as possible by installing aluminum doors, an aluminum hood, a carbon fibre engine cover, and a carbon fibre rear spoiler. Like the flat-6 versions, the new RGT-8 also includes ceramic brakes, an integrated roll-cage, and 19-inch forged alloy wheels with Michelin Pilot Sport Cup tires.

Specifications 
(Data shown is for the 997 RGT 3.8L model)
Weight: 
Power:  @ 7600 rpm
Torque:  @ 5100 rpm
Specific output: approx.  per litre
Power-to-weight ratio: approx.  per horsepower
0-: 4.2 seconds
Top Speed:

Third generation (2012–present) 

In 2012, the latest version of RGT-8 was unveiled at the Geneva Motor Show. However, this model is an all-new car based on Porsche 991 rather than an update. The cost of the RGT-8 is approximately €200,000, not including the price of the Porsche 991 donor car.

References

External links 
 

Cars powered by boxer engines
RGT
Cars introduced in 2000
Rear-engined cars
Sports cars
Coupés
Cars introduced in 2005
Cars introduced in 2012